Tatiana Najera Cardona (born July 17, 1988) is a Colombian model, who was a Miss Colombia 2010 contestant, where she was the third place finalist.

She was born in Cartagena de Indias. She has a master's degree in international business and integration and a bachelor's degree in political sciences. She is fluent in English, French, Spanish, and Portuguese and has knowledge of Italian.

Miss Colombia
Cardona's charisma and smile led her to get 9.7 in the evening dress category and 9.7 in bathing suit. She was given the honor of representing Colombia at Miss Intercontinental.

References

1988 births
Living people
People from Cartagena, Colombia
Colombian beauty pageant winners
Colombian female models